Dick Wesson may refer to:

 Dick Wesson (announcer) (1919–1979), American film and television announcer
 Dick Wesson (actor) (1922–1996), American character actor, comedian, comedy writer and producer